Daniel Ordóñez Hernández (born 13 June 1968) is a Mexican lawyer and politician affiliated with the Party of the Democratic Revolution. He represents the 13th federal district of Mexico City as a deputy in the LXIII Legislature of the Mexican Congress.

Life
As he worked toward his law degree from the UNAM, which he obtained in 1993, Ordóñez served as a legal advisor to the PRD faction in the LV Legislature (1991–94) and again during the LVII Legislature (1997-2000). However, Ordóñez primarily worked as a lawyer, being a partner at the law office of Ordóñez, Nava and Cisneros from 1994–95, as well as an associated lawyer for Grupo Abogados Empresariales between 1995 and 1998.

In the early 2000s, Ordóñez primarily served in various roles in the PRD. He was a state-level councilor from 1998 to 2005, a regional coordinator for the fourth electoral region in 2000, the National Affiliation Coordinator from 2000 to 2001, a special delegate from the national party when Boca del Río, Veracruz had special internal elections in 2002, and a national councilor between 2003 and 2006.

In 2003, Ordóñez broke into the Chamber of Deputies for the first time, in the LIX Legislature. He was a secretary on two commissions: one dealing with government, as well as a special commission following corruption and public officials in the state of Morelos involved with drug trafficking.

After the LIX Legislature concluded, Ordóñez served twice in the Legislative Assembly of the Federal District, from 2006 to 2009 and again from 2012 to 2015. In the first of two stints, he presided over the Commission for the Administration and Prosecution of Justice; in the second, he served on seven commissions and two committees. Between 2013 and 2015, Ordóñez was associated with the National Public Administration Institute (INAP).

Voters in the 13th district of Mexico City sent Ordóñez back to the Chamber of Deputies in 2015. He is the president of the Constitutional Points Committee and also serves on two others: Federal District and Justice.

References

1968 births
Living people
People from Mexico City
20th-century Mexican lawyers
Members of the Chamber of Deputies (Mexico) for Mexico City
Party of the Democratic Revolution politicians
21st-century Mexican politicians
Deputies of the LXIII Legislature of Mexico